The 1980–81 All-Ireland Senior Club Football Championship was the 11th staging of the All-Ireland Senior Club Football Championship since its establishment by the Gaelic Athletic Association in 1970-71.

St. Finbarr's were the defending champions.

On 31 May 1981, St. Finbarr's won the championship following a 1-08 to 0-06 defeat of Walterstown in the All-Ireland final at Croke Park. It was their second championship title overall and their second title in succession.

Munster Senior Club Football Championship

Munster first round

Munster semi-finals

Munster final

All-Ireland Senior Club Football Championship

All-Ireland quarter-final

All-Ireland semi-finals

All-Ireland final

Championship statistics

Miscellaneous

 Walterstown won the Leinster Club Championship for the first time in their history.

References

1980 in Gaelic football
1981 in Gaelic football